Logan is an unincorporated community in Brouilletts Creek Township, Edgar County, Illinois, United States.

References

Unincorporated communities in Edgar County, Illinois
Unincorporated communities in Illinois